Hidehito (written: 秀人 or 英飛人) is a masculine Japanese given name. Notable people with the name include:

, Japanese sumo wrestler
, Japanese footballer

Japanese masculine given names